Stephen D. Krashen (born May 14, 1941) is an American linguist, educational researcher and activist, who is Emeritus Professor of Education at the University of Southern California. He moved from the linguistics department to the faculty of the School of Education in 1994.

Work
Stephen Krashen received a Ph.D. in Linguistics from the University of California, Los Angeles in 1972.
Krashen has among papers (peer-reviewed and not) and books, more than 486 publications, contributing to the fields of second-language acquisition, bilingual education, and reading. He is known  for introducing various hypotheses related to second-language acquisition, including the acquisition-learning hypothesis, the input hypothesis, the monitor hypothesis, the affective filter, and the natural order hypothesis. Most recently, Krashen promotes the use of free voluntary reading during second-language acquisition, which he says "is the most powerful tool we have in language education, first and second."

Awards
 1985: co-winner of the Pimsleur Award, given by the American Council of Foreign Language Teachers for the best published article
 1986: his paper "Lateralisation, language learning and the critical period" was selected as Citation Class by Current Contents
 1993: the Distinguished Presentation related to School Library Media Centers, was awarded to by editors of the School Library Media Annual
 1982: winner of the Mildenberger Award, given for his book, Second Language Acquisition and Second Language Learning (Prentice-Hall)
 2005: Krashen was inducted into the International Reading Association's Reading Hall of Fame.
 2005: elected at the National Association for Bilingual Education Executive Board.

Educational policy activism

As education policy in Krashen's home state of California became increasingly hostile to bilingualism, he responded with research critical of the new policies, public speaking engagements, and with letters written to newspaper editors. During the campaign to enact an anti-bilingual education law in California in 1998, known as Proposition 227, Krashen campaigned aggressively in public forums, media talk shows, and conducted numerous interviews with journalists writing on the subject. After other anti-bilingual education campaigns and attempts to enact regressive language education policies surfaced around the country, by 2006 it was estimated that Krashen had submitted well over 1,000 letters to editors.

In a front-page New Times LA article published just a week before the vote on Proposition 227, Jill Stewart penned a critical article titled "Krashen Burn" in which she characterized Krashen as wedded to the monied interests of a "multi-million-dollar bilingual education industry." Stewart critically spoke of Krashen's bilingual education model.

Krashen has been an advocate for a more activist role by researchers in combating what he considers the public's misconceptions about bilingual education. Addressing the question of how to explain public opposition to bilingual education, Krashen queried, "Is it due to a stubborn disinformation campaign on the part of newspapers and other news media to deliberately destroy bilingual education? Or is it due to the failure of the profession to present its side of the story to reporters? There is a great deal of anecdotal evidence in support of the latter." Continuing, Krashen wrote, "Without a serious, dedicated and organized campaign to explain and defend bilingual education at the national level, in a very short time we will have nothing left to defend."

Writing

References

External links
 Response to criticism by Ron Unz
 NPR Talk of the Nation episode featuring Stephen Krashen
 Krashen's Comprehension Hypothesis Model of L2 learning Applied linguist Vivian Cook's page on Krashen's hypotheses.
 YouTube talk in 2015 by Krashen   https://www.youtube.com/watch?v=a3pipsG_dQk
 YouTube talk in 2020 by Krashen on SLA, reading and research https://www.youtube.com/watch?v=S0WfMgH_qPs

1941 births
Linguists from the United States
People from Chicago
American educational theorists
Educational psychologists
University of Southern California faculty
Living people
Bilingualism and second-language acquisition researchers